Montecristo Trifinio National Park is a national park in Honduras. It was established on 1 January 1987 and covers an area of 54 square kilometres.

The Montecristo massif is an area where the borders of Honduras, Guatemala and El Salvador meet, and its protection was a joint initiative of these three countries, which resulted in the creation of the national parks in Honduras and El Salvador, as well as the Guatemalan Trifinio Biosphere Reserve.

References

National parks of Honduras
Protected areas established in 1987
Central American montane forests